Utrop ('Outcry') is a Norwegian biweekly, multicultural newspaper.

It was established in 2001 as the first online newspaper for minorities in Norway. The newspaper was expanded to a paper version in June 2004. Editor-in-chief is Majoran Vivekananthan.

References

External links
Official website

Publications established in 2001
Internet properties established in 2001
2001 establishments in Norway
Newspapers published in Oslo